Neram Vandhachu is a 1982 Indian Tamil-language drama film directed by M. Vellaisamy. The film stars Karthik and Radha.

Plot

Major Kuppusamy, is a wealthy millionaire, but a widower. He is very strict with his daughter Radha (Radha) and makes her live a military- like lifestyle (getting up very early in the morning, being punctual in every small thing etc.) She isn't allowed even to venture out of their bungalow. However, one day Kuppusamy announces Radha's wedding with Ravi (Thiagarajan), who is, unbeknownst to him, a criminal.

Disheartened, Radha runs away from home. She hides in a small house to escape from those pursuing her. The house happens to be that of a quirky, hapless journalist, Raja (Karthik). Radha, in the pretense if being an orphan, requests him to give her shelter. A reluctant Raja is initially hesitant, but eventually falls in love with her. He goes to Veeraiah (Karate R. V. T. Mani), a Karate master, for advice on how to win her heart. On the other hand, his press manager asks him to find a missing girl, promising him a huge reward, and gives him Radha's photo. Raja, however, doesn't want to send her back to her strict father and wicked fiancée though it involves forgoing the prospective reward. Seeing this, Radha realises his true love for her, and they both decide to get married with Veeraiah's help.

Kuppusamy learns from Rekha (Silk Smitha), that Ravi is an immoral criminal, and that he has cheated on many girls, including her. Ravi and his father realise that their game has been exposed and trap Kuppusamy. They also try to kill Raja and Radha. Will they succeed in there wicked endeavor? Will Raja and Radha unite? If so, how? This forms the rest of the story. The movie makes many references to the evergreen hit Alaigal Oivathillai and has the same lead actors from the movie. Also there lies a secret in the story involving Veeraiah, Raja, Radha and Kuppusamy.

Cast
Karthik
Radha
Karate R. V. T. Mani
Thiagarajan
Usharani
Thyagu
Thumbu
Silk Smitha
Ganthimathi
Dheenaratchagan
S. Jayaram
M. R. Krishnasamy
Kittu
Uslaimani
Bayilvan Ranganathan
Nalla Thambi

Soundtrack 
01.Thakkaali Odambu
02.Pillaiyare Pillaiyare
03.Panneail Neeradum Raja
04.Kaadal Mandiratil

Reception

References

External links
 

1982 films
1980s Tamil-language films
Films scored by Shankar–Ganesh